Creepshow (Original Motion Picture Soundtrack) is the soundtrack album to the 1982 horror film Creepshow, composed and conducted by John Harrison. The soundtrack album was released by Varèse Sarabande Records as an LP record in the United States in 1982.

Original 1982 release

Track listing
First release on LP by Varèse Sarabande Records. For the original soundtrack, the time length for the score was only 40 minutes and 58 seconds.

Subsequent releases

Release history

2003 CD release

First release on CD by La-La Land Records in 2003. It is identical in content to the LP release, except for the addition of music from Tales from the Darkside, Mansions of the Moon and Shoobie Doobie Moon.

2014 Expanded Edition

The 2014 release includes the complete film score, including expanded and unreleased tracks.

References

1982 soundtrack albums
1980s film soundtrack albums
Varèse Sarabande soundtracks
La-La Land Records soundtracks
Horror film soundtracks